St. Anton am Arlberg is a railway station on the Arlberg railway between Innsbruck and Bludenz in Tyrol, Austria.

Services

Rail services 
St. Anton provides long-distance connections only, since regional traffic on the Arlberg mountain section was abandoned completely. In the winter season it is an important station for special ski trains from Denmark, Germany and the Netherlands whereas in the summer season it is even a scheduled stop of the Orient Express.

It is serviced by:
InterCityExpress: Vienna–Innsbruck–Bregenz
ÖBB-EuroCity: Vienna/Graz–Innsbruck–Feldkirch–Bregenz/Zürich–Basel (CH)
EuroNight: Vienna/Graz–Innsbruck–Feldkirch–Bregenz/Zürich (CH)
InterCity: Innsbruck–Dortmund/Münster (D)

!Previous Station!!!!ÖBB!!!!Next Station

Bus services 
Two coach lines depart from St. Anton's station forecourt:
Pettneu am Arlberg–Flirsch–Strengen–Pians–Landeck-Zams 
St. Christoph am Arlberg–Zürs–Lech am Arlberg

See also 

Arlberg railway
Arlbergtunnel

External links 
St. Anton am Arlberg railway station at www.arlbergbahn.at  

Railway stations in Tyrol (state)
Railway stations opened in 1884
Railway stations opened in 2000